Eupithecia sectilinea is a moth in the family Geometridae. It is found in Cameroon.

References

Moths described in 1988
sectilinea
Moths of Africa